Visitors to Jamaica must obtain a visa from one of the Jamaican diplomatic missions, or in certain cases from one of the United Kingdom diplomatic missions, unless they come from one of the 116 countries designated as visa-exempt countries or countries whose citizens may obtain a visa on arrival. Most Commonwealth Citizens can visit Jamaica for up to 180 days visa-free.

Visa policy map

Visa exemption

Visa free
Citizens of the following 106 countries and territories can visit Jamaica without a visa for tourism or business purposes (unless otherwise noted):

T - Visa free for tourism only.
1 - For holders of vaccination certificate for Measles, Polio and Rubella only.

Holders of diplomatic or official/service/special passports issued to nationals of Cuba do not require a visa for Jamaica.

Visa on arrival
Citizens of the following 24(+1) countries and territories can visit Jamaica by obtaining a visa on arrival for US$100:

It envisages a visa exemption for holders of diplomatic and official passports and a visa on arrival for ordinary passport holders.

Unconditional Landing Stamp
Visa is not required for holders of passports or other travel documents of any country endorsed with an "Unconditional Landing" stamp issued by Jamaican authorities.

Visa waiver 
Under certain conditions some visa requiring nationals are exempt for tourist visits up to 30 days unless otherwise stated.

Nationals of any country with a residence permit issued by Canada or a U.S. Green Card are exempt for visits up to 6 months.

Nationals of  that are holders of a valid visa issued by Canada, United States, United Kingdom or Schengen member states.

Nationals of  that are holders of a valid visa issued by Canada or the United States.

Future changes
  – Visa free agreement has been signed but yet to be ratified.

Visitor statistics
Most visitors arriving to Jamaica were from the following countries of nationality:

See also

Visa requirements for Jamaican citizens

References

Jamaica
Foreign relations of Jamaica